Annan Koil is a village near Sirkazhi in Mayiladuthurai district of Tamil Nadu, (South India). The main occupation of the people is agriculture. The soil is alluvial and the village is well irrigated by the river Kaveri which flows into the Bay Of Bengal.

Although this is a delta region, the people here mainly depend upon seasonal rainfall. The North-east Monsoon provides rain for agriculture.

Location 

This village is well connected with roadway NH-45 (Sirkazi to Kaarikal)
7 km from Sirkazi.

Temple 

A famous Vishnu temple Annan Perumal Koil is located here. The temple is one of the 108 Divya Desams revered by the 12 poet saints, the Alvars, the Tamil poet-saints and followers of Bhakti.

Temple Details
1. God       -  Vishnu named as Annan Perumal(Srinivasan)
2. Goddess   -  Maha Lakshmi (Alarmel Mangai Thayaar)
3. Vimanam   - Thathva dhyothaka Vimanam
4. Pushkarani(Temple Tank) - Thiruvellakulam (Swetha Pushkarani)
5. Prathyaksham - Rudhran(Swetharanyeswarar - Thalaichangadu), Swetha Maharaja
6. Mangalasasanam - Thirumangai Alwar (Periya Thirumozhi 4-7) 10 pasurams
7. Sthalathar - Thirunangur Prathivadhibhayankaram Family
8. Utsavam - Purattasi Chithirai to Purattasi Avittam (Sep-Oct)

The Temple is managed by Tamil Nadu Government's HR&CE ministry.
Battachar(Priest) and Parcharaka of the temple are appointed by government.

பெருமாள் -- அண்ணன் பெருமாள் (எ)ஸ்ரீனிவாச பெருமாள்
தாயார் -- அலர்மேல் மங்கை
புஷ்கரணி -- சுவேத புஷ்கரணி
ப்ரிதிக்க்ஷேம் -- சுவேத மகாராஜா
இது சோழ நாட்டு 108 திவ்ய தேசங்களில் ஒன்று , சிர்காழிலிருந்து காரைக்கால் செல்லும் வழியில், *சிர்காழிலிருந்து சுமார் 7 கிலோமீட்டர் தொலைவில் அமைத்துள்ளது .
திருநாங்கூர் 11 திவ்ய தேசங்களில் முதன்மையானது.
குமுதவல்லி நாட்சியார் அவதார ஸ்தலம் .
திருமங்கை ஆழ்வார் இங்கே 10 பாசுரங்கள் மங்களாசனம் செய்துள்ளார் .

References

Annan Perumal Kovil - Thiruvellakkulam
Sri Annan Perumal Kovil (Thiruvellakulam)
- Nearby temples (PDF)

Villages in Mayiladuthurai district